`Urjan al Gharbiyah is a town in the Amman Governorate of north-western Jordan.

It is located north of the capital of Amman.

References

Populated places in Amman Governorate